Suburban Station is an art deco office building and underground commuter rail station in Penn Center in Philadelphia. Its official SEPTA address is 16th Street and JFK Boulevard. The station is owned and operated by SEPTA and is one of the three core Center City stations on the SEPTA Regional Rail and one of the busiest stations in the Regional Rail System. 

The station, which was built by the Pennsylvania Railroad to replace the original Broad Street Station, opened on September 28, 1930.

History
The station opened as a stub-end terminal for Pennsylvania Railroad suburban commuter trains serving Center City Philadelphia, intended to replace the above-ground Broad Street Station in this function.  PRR inter-city trains, on the other hand,  would use Thirtieth Street Station.  The station's full name was originally Broad Street Suburban Station. It also includes a 21-story office tower, One Penn Center, which served as the headquarters of the PRR from 1930 to 1957.

When Amtrak took over the Silverliner Service from Penn Central in 1972, it was operated as a quasi-commuter service (Clockers and express trains to New York) that terminated at Suburban Station. The trains through Harrisburg were named Keystone Service in 1981. By the late 1980s, the Metroliners used for the service were in poor shape, but Amtrak had a shortage of AEM-7 locomotives due to wrecks. On February 1, 1988, Amtrak converted all Keystone Service trains to diesel power and terminated them on the lower level of 30th Street Station, as diesel-powered trains were not allowed in the tunnels to Suburban Station. The change was listed as "temporary" on timetables starting on May 15, 1988, and lasting into 1990.

Suburban Station was originally a stub-end terminal station with eight tracks and four platforms. Plans for a tunnel to link the Pennsylvania and Reading commuter lines were floated as early as the 1950s, but funding to seriously study the project did not start until SEPTA's formation in the late 1960s.  The project languished in the 1970s for want of funding until federal money was appropriated during Philadelphia mayor Frank Rizzo's time in office. SEPTA took over operation of all commuter rail service in the Philadelphia area in 1983; it had previously contracted their operations to Conrail from 1976 to 1983 and to PRR and Reading from 1966 to 1976. A train crash occurred here on December 10, 1986, when an Airport Line train rammed a stopped Chestnut Hill West train injuring 42 people. The operator tested positive for drugs.

The long-awaited link between the old PRR and Reading lines, the Center City Commuter Connection, opened in 1984. It extended four tracks eastward to the new Market East Station (now Jefferson Station), widened two of the existing platforms, added a fifth platform and realigned the tracks. The recently renovated building above is also the core of the Penn Center office complex, and is known as One Penn Center at Suburban Station. The office building attained an Energy Star Rating in 2009.

BLT Architects transformed Suburban Station in 2006.  The station was redesigned to make navigation easier and adapt to current pedestrian traffic. Upgrades included increased retail space, a reactivated and improved HVAC system, and a restored/refurbished waiting area. The station is now in full compliance with the Americans with Disabilities Act of 1990. The Comcast Center, situated on the north half of its block near Arch Street, adds a "winter garden" on the south side, which serves as a new back entrance to the station, with the commuter rail tracks about 50 feet below street level.

Services
All SEPTA Regional Rail trains stop at this station.  All run through except those on the Cynwyd Line as well as some limited/express trains which terminate on one of the stub-end tracks at this station. Through trains usually change crews at this station.

The station has an extensive concourse level above track level. This concourse has SEPTA ticket offices, retail shops and restaurants, and access to other SEPTA stations and to several Center City buildings. The connections, via the large Center City Concourse, include the Broad Street Line at City Hall station, the Market-Frankford Line and Subway-Surface Lines at the 15th Street station, and the PATCO Speedline at 15–16th & Locust station.

Station layout
The station has a total of 8 tracks and 5 island platforms.

Gallery

References

External links

SEPTA - Suburban Station
Pennsylvania Railroad - Suburban Station (Pennsylvania Railroad Stations; Past & Present)
 JFK Boulevard and 17th Street entrance from Google Maps Street View
 JFK Boulevard and 18th Street entrance from Google Maps Street View
 JFK Boulevard and 16th Street entrance from Google Maps Street View
 16th Street entrance from Google Maps Street View
 Main entrance from Google Maps Street View
 JFK Boulevard and 15th Street entrance from Google Maps Street View

SEPTA Regional Rail stations
Philadelphia Suburban
Railway stations in the United States opened in 1930
Railway stations on the National Register of Historic Places in Philadelphia
Former Amtrak stations in Pennsylvania
Penn Center, Philadelphia
Railway stations located underground in Pennsylvania
Stations on the SEPTA Main Line
Wilmington/Newark Line